Lanceoptera is a genus of moths in the family Gelechiidae. It contains the species Lanceoptera panochra, which is found in South Africa.

References

Endemic moths of South Africa
Apatetrinae
Monotypic moth genera
Moths of Africa